William Shand was elected to the House of Assembly of Jamaica in 1820 for the parish of Saint John.

References

External links 

Members of the House of Assembly of Jamaica
Year of birth missing
Year of death missing